Commander of the Lucky 'Pike' is a 1972 Soviet war film directed by Boris Volchek.

The film's title is a pun in Russian, the submarine 'Щ-721' is nicknamed as pike.

Plot
In 1942, when the German troops are preparing to seize Murmansk, the Soviet command decides to intensify the activities of the Northern Fleet. The crew of the submarine 'Щ-721' performs the task of destroying enemy transport with soldiers and ammunition. The submarine of Strogov is considered to be lucky. The crew under his leadership works wonders and gets out of difficult situations. Also, Strogov is developing a tactic of a non-referential torpedo attack in spite of the skepticism of his colleagues and leadership. During the execution of the combat mission, has to take on board the boat the evacuated crew of another Soviet submarine. Fascists lead a long pursuit after the submarine. In the end, it finds itself in an almost desperate situation - at the bottom of the sea  almost without oxygen. Commander Aleksei Strogov manages to save the boat and crew, paying for it with his life ...

Cast
Pyotr Velyaminov as Captain Aleksei Petrovich Strogov
Donatas Banionis as Commissar Viktor Ionovich Sherknis (voiced by Aleksandr Demyanenko)
Elena Dobronravova as Engineer Svetlana Ivanovna Vedenina
Vladimir Ivanov as Red-fleet, torpedo operator Golik
Mikhail Volkov as Captain-lieutenant, commander of the submarine No. 703 Valery Rudakov
Vladimir Kashpur as Midshipman, boatswain Nosov (Kuzmich)
Stanislav Borodokin as Sergeant-major of the first degree, radio operator Sergei Shukhov
Shota Mshvenieradze as Sergeant of the second degree Shota Kharadze
Konstantin Raikin as Cook Bulkin
Nikita Astakhov as Red Navy member
Anatoly Borisov as German Admiral
Pavel Makhotin as Commander of the Northern Fleet, Vice Admiral
Svetlana Sukhovey as Oksana
Valentina Berezutskaya as Storekeeper
Yevgeny Yevstigneyev as Stepan Lukich
Lyubov Sokolova as Aunt Dusya

References

External links
 

1972 drama films
1972 films
1970s war drama films
Films scored by Aleksandr Zatsepin
Mosfilm films
1970s Russian-language films
Russian war drama films
Soviet war drama films
World War II submarine films
Russian World War II films
Soviet World War II films